Let Me Play With Your Poodle is a blues album by Marcia Ball.  It was released on June 24, 1997 on Rounder Records. AllMusic noted: "This album of snaky swamp rock is one of Ball's best recordings".

Track listing
All songs written by Marcia Ball except as noted.
"Let Me Play With Your Poodle" (Hudson Whittaker) - 4:14
"Why Women Cry" - 3:29
"Crawfishin'" (Clarence Garlow, Leon Rene) - 2:53
"How Big a Fool" (Speeks) - 3:55
"The Right Tool for the Job" - 4:15
"I'm Just a Prisoner (Of Your Good Lovin')" (Eddie Harris, George Jackson) - 3:39
"I Still Love You" (Eamonn Campbell) - 6:14
"Can't Trust My Heart" (Delbert McClinton) - 3:30
"The Story of My Life" - 3:59
"Something I Can't Do" (Mike Duke) - 3:25
"For the Love of a Man" - 5:29
"American Dream" - 3:59
"Louisiana 1927" (Randy Newman) - 5:13

References

1997 albums
Blues albums by American artists
Marcia Ball albums
Rounder Records albums